WKVN (95.3 FM) is a radio station broadcasting the K-Love network. Licensed to Morganfield, Kentucky, United States, the station serves the Evansville area. The station is currently owned by the Educational Media Foundation and broadcasts out of Rocklin, California.

History
The station was first licensed on August 4, 1967, and held the call sign WMSK-FM. On 2006-11-01, the station changed its call sign to WEZG. On 2009-02-29, the call sign was changed again to reflect the new format and ownership.

References

External links

K-Love radio stations
Educational Media Foundation radio stations
1967 establishments in Kentucky
KVN
Radio stations established in 1967
Morganfield, Kentucky